The SNCF Class BB 61000 diesel locomotives were built by Vossloh to their G1206 design between 2002-2005 for the French state railways. Twenty three locomotives were built, numbered 61001–61023. As they are operated by the freight sector, the locomotives carry a '4' prefix (i.e. they are numbered 461001-461023).

These are the second locomotives to be numbered in this range, the first being the Class C 61000 (+ TC 61100).

Fleet list

References

61000 2
Vossloh locomotives
B′B′ locomotives
SNCF BB 61000
Railway locomotives introduced in 2002
Standard gauge locomotives of France
Diesel-hydraulic locomotives

Freight locomotives